Charles Roy Abbey (24 November 1913 – 2 September 1982) was an Australian farmer and politician who served as a Liberal Party member of the Legislative Council of Western Australia from 1958 to 1977.

Abbey was born in Fremantle to Clara Gertrude (née Berry) and Charles Thomas Abbey. His parents moved to Beverley (a Wheatbelt farming community) when he was a small child. Abbey worked as a shop assistant after leaving school and then turned to farming, leasing a property near the Dale River for five years before purchasing it outright. He was prominent in local agricultural circles and also served on the Beverley Road Board from 1953 to 1962. Abbey entered parliament at the 1958 Legislative Council election, defeating Norm Baxter of the Country Party in Central Province. After a redistribution, he transferred to West Province at the 1965 state election, which he held until his retirement in 1977. Abbey retired to Mandurah, dying there in September 1982 (aged 68). He had married Winifred Doreen Strange in 1941, with whom he had one daughter.

References

1913 births
1982 deaths
Australian farmers
Liberal Party of Australia members of the Parliament of Western Australia
Members of the Western Australian Legislative Council
People from Beverley, Western Australia
Western Australian local councillors